The All-Ireland Junior Club Hurling Championship is an annual inter-county club hurling competition organised by the Gaelic Athletic Association (GAA) since 2002-03 for eligible hurling clubs. Clubs qualify for the competition based on their performance in their county club championships.

The final, usually held in early February, serves as the culmination of a series of games played during the winter months, and the results determine which county's team receives the cup. The championship has always been played on a straight knockout basis whereby once a team loses they are eliminated from the series. In the present format, it begins in October with provincial championships held in Connacht, Leinster, Munster and Ulster, with the four respective champions contesting the subsequent All-Ireland series with the British champions.

Ballygiblin are the title-holders, defeating Easkey by 1-16 to 0-11 in the 2023 final.

Qualification

The GAA Hurling All-Ireland Junior Club Championship features five teams in the final tournament. 32 teams contest the five provincial junior club championships with the four provincial champions, and the British champions, automatically qualifying for the All-Ireland series.

List of finals

Roll of honour

By club

By county

By province

Records and statistics

Winning teams

Provincial Champions

See also
 Munster Junior Club Hurling Championship
 Leinster Junior Club Hurling Championship
 Connacht Junior Club Hurling Championship
 Ulster Junior Club Hurling Championship
 All-Ireland Senior Club Hurling Championship
 All-Ireland Intermediate Club Hurling Championship
 All-Ireland Junior B Club Hurling Championship
 All-Ireland Senior Club Camogie Championship
 All-Ireland Senior Club Football Championship

External links
 Complete Roll of Honour Available Here
 2009 Final
 Photograph from 2008 Final
 2011 Final report

References

 
Junior